The Baconator sandwich is a cheeseburger sold by the international fast-food restaurant chain Wendy's.

History
The Baconator was introduced in April 2007 as part of a "back to basics" reorganization by Wendy's new CEO Kerri Anderson. The addition of the product was part of a push to add menu items that appeal to the 18- to 34-year-old demographic and expand late-night sales. This product and others, coupled with a new advertising program, contributed to an increase in store sales of approximately 11% during the period of five fiscal quarters ending in October 2007.

Advertising
As a cross promotion with the Canadian Football League, the Baconator has been named the official burger of the league. They held a promotion running from April–May 2009 in which special scratch tickets shaped like bacon were given out with each purchase. In addition to being able to enter a draw to win an Xbox 360 by texting the number, the person could enter the numbers online to win a chance to compete in a halftime CFL contest to build a giant Baconator, with the winner getting $25,000. This was termed the 'Baconator Boot Camp'. During the promotion, the store workers wore T-shirts advertising the contest.  On August 14, 2009, Pete Richardson from Halifax, Nova Scotia won the contest and the prize of $25,000, in front of a capacity crowd of 24,754 at the Rogers Centre.

Ingredients
Bacon strips
Hamburger bun
Two whole-beef patties
Ketchup
Mayonnaise
American cheese

See also
BK Stacker – a similar product from Burger King.

References

Wendy's foods
Bacon sandwiches
Cheese sandwiches
Fast food hamburgers